Francisco Javier 'Javi' Barranco Lucas (born 3 February 1987) is a Spanish footballer who plays for CD Toledo as a central midfielder.

Club career
Born in Utrera, Province of Seville, Barranco finished his formation with local Sevilla FC, making his senior debuts with the C-team. On 8 January 2006 he first appeared with the reserves, starting in a 0–0 home draw against Écija Balompié in the Segunda División B; he continued to feature mainly for the third side in his beginnings, however.

On 31 August 2008 Barranco made his professional debut with the Andalusians' second team, starting in a 1–2 Segunda División loss at Albacete Balompié. On 10 January of the following year he scored his first goal in the competition, in a 1–1 home draw against SD Huesca.

In July 2010 Barranco signed with another reserve team, CA Osasuna B in the third level. He continued to compete in the category in the following years, representing Real Unión, CE L'Hospitalet and CD Toledo.

References

External links

1987 births
Living people
Spanish footballers
People from Utrera
Sportspeople from the Province of Seville
Footballers from Andalusia
Association football midfielders
Segunda División players
Segunda División B players
Tercera División players
Sevilla FC C players
Sevilla Atlético players
CA Osasuna B players
Real Unión footballers
CE L'Hospitalet players
CD Toledo players